The women's 4 × 400 metres relay event at the 1981 Summer Universiade was held at the Stadionul Naţional in Bucharest on 26 July 1981. It was the first time that this event was contested by women at the Universiade.

Results

References

Athletics at the 1981 Summer Universiade
1981